Geophagus altifrons is a freshwater eartheater cichlid fish native to the Amazon River Basin, Brazil.

Introduced to Singapore, it thrives in slow-moving streams and reservoirs. Its ecological impact on its adopted habitat is still unknown.

It is benthophagous by nature, taking mouthfuls of substrate (hence its common name) and sifting for edible items, with the remaining materials being expelled via the mouth and gill openings. It prefers clear and blackwater environments as opposed to turbid white waters.

See also
 List of freshwater aquarium fish species

References 

altifrons
Freshwater fish of South America
Fish of Brazil
Endemic fauna of Brazil
Fish of Singapore
Fish described in 1840
Taxa named by Johann Jakob Heckel